Mama Roots is an album by organist Charlie Earland which was recorded in 1969 and 1977 and released on the Muse label. The album contains reissues tracks from Earland's 1969 albums Boss Organ and Soul Crib.

Reception

The AllMusic review by Ron Wynn stated "Impressive reunion with George Coleman (ts). Also includes Jimmy Ponder on guitar".

Track listing
All compositions by Charles Earland except where noted
 "Undecided" (Charlie Shavers) – 7:44
 "The Dozens" – 3:47
 "Red, Green & Black Blues" – 4:54
 "Mama Roots" – 6:32
 "Old Folks" (Dedette Lee Hill, Willard Robison) – 5:26
 "Bluesette" (Toots Thielemans) – 6:35

Personnel
Charles Earland – organ
George Coleman (tracks 1, 2, 4 & 5), Dave Schnitter (track 1) – tenor saxophone
Jimmy Ponder – guitar
Walter Perkins (tracks 1, 2, 4 & 5), Bobby Durham (tracks 3 & 6)  – drums

References

Muse Records albums
Charles Earland albums
1979 albums
Albums produced by Ozzie Cadena
Albums recorded at Van Gelder Studio